Sadam Suliman Koumi el-Nour (born 6 April 1994) is a Sudanese sprinter.

Koumi was a finalist in the 400 metres at the 2011 World Youth Championships in Athletics, but did not finish the race due to injury. The same year he won gold medals in the 400 metres and the 4 × 400 metres relay at the 2011 African Junior Championships.

Also in the 4 × 400 metres relay, he was also part of the Sudanese squad that finished fourth at the 2010 African Championships and sixth at the 2016 African Championships. Individually he finished fifth at the 2015 African Games. He was disqualified in the final at the 2016 African Championships.

He competed in the men's 400 metres at the 2020 Summer Olympics.

References

1994 births
Living people
Sudanese male sprinters
Athletes (track and field) at the 2010 Summer Youth Olympics
Athletes (track and field) at the 2015 African Games
African Games competitors for Sudan
Athletes (track and field) at the 2019 African Games
Athletes (track and field) at the 2020 Summer Olympics
Olympic athletes of Sudan